The NN postcode area, also known as the Northampton postcode area, is a group of nineteen postcode districts in England, within eight post towns. These cover most of Northamptonshire (including Northampton, Kettering, Wellingborough, Corby, Brackley, Daventry, Rushden and Towcester), plus very small parts of Bedfordshire, Buckinghamshire, Leicestershire, Oxfordshire and Warwickshire.



Coverage
The approximate coverage of the postcode districts:

|-
! NN1
| NORTHAMPTON
| Northampton
| West Northamptonshire
|-
! NN2
| NORTHAMPTON
| Kingsthorpe, Boughton
| West Northamptonshire
|-
! NN3
| NORTHAMPTON
| Abington (East), Bellinge, Blackthorn, Boothville, Ecton Brook, Great Billing, Headlands, Kingsley Park, Lings, Little Billing, Moulton, Moulton Park, Parklands, Rectory Farm, Round Spinney, Southfields, Spinney Hill, Standens Barn, Thorplands, Weston Favell
| West Northamptonshire 
|-
! NN4
| NORTHAMPTON
| Brackmills, Delapré, East Hunsbury, Far Cotton,  Grange Park, Great Houghton, Hardingstone, West Hunsbury, Wootton
| West Northamptonshire
|-
! NN5
| NORTHAMPTON
| Duston, New Duston Kings Heath, St James, Dallington, Spencer, St Crispins, Upton, Sixfields
| West Northamptonshire
|-
! NN6
| NORTHAMPTON
| Brixworth, Cold Ashby, Crick, Earls Barton, Ecton, Guilsborough, Long Buckby Spratton, Sywell, West Haddon, East Haddon, Church Brampton, Chapel Brampton
| West Northamptonshire, North Northamptonshire, Harborough
|-
! NN7
| NORTHAMPTON
| Blisworth, Bugbrooke, Castle Ashby, Cogenhoe, Dodford, Flore, Gayton, Grafton Regis, Hackleton, Harpole, Harlestone, Hartwell, Horton, Milton Malsor, Nether Heyford, Piddington, Preston Deanery, Quinton, Roade, Rothersthorpe, Stoke Bruerne, Weedon Bec, Yardley Gobion, Yardley Hastings
| West Northamptonshire
|-
! NN8
| WELLINGBOROUGH
| Wellingborough, Wilby
| North Northamptonshire
|-
! NN9
| WELLINGBOROUGH
| Wellingborough, Chelveston, Finedon, Great Harrowden, Irthlingborough, Little Harrowden, Raunds 
| North Northamptonshire
|-
! NN10
| RUSHDEN
| Higham Ferrers, Rushden, Wymington
| North Northamptonshire, Bedford
|-
! NN11
| DAVENTRY
| Braunston, Daventry, Greens Norton, Hinton, Moreton Pinkney, Welton, Lower Shuckburgh
| West Northamptonshire, Stratford-on-Avon 
|-
! NN12
| TOWCESTER
| Abthorpe, Caswell, Greens Norton, Silverstone, Towcester, Weston
| West Northamptonshire
|-
! NN13
| BRACKLEY
| Brackley, Croughton, Farthinghoe, Hinton-in-the-Hedges, Westbury, Turweston, Mixbury
| West Northamptonshire, Buckinghamshire, Cherwell
|-
! NN14
| KETTERING
| Broughton, Desborough, Geddington, Isham, Pytchley, Rothwell, Thorpe Malsor, Thrapston, Hardwick
| North Northamptonshire
|-
! NN15
| KETTERING
| Burton Latimer, Barton Seagrave
| North Northamptonshire
|-
! NN16
| KETTERING
| Kettering 
| North Northamptonshire
|-
! NN17
| CORBY
| Corby, Bulwick
| North Northamptonshire
|-
! NN18
| CORBY
| Great Oakley, Little Oakley
| North Northamptonshire
|-
! NN29
| WELLINGBOROUGH
| Bozeat, Great Doddington, Irchester, Podington, Wollaston
| Bedford, North Northamptonshire
|-
! style="background:#FFFFFF;"|NN99
| style="background:#FFFFFF;"|
| style="background:#FFFFFF;"|
| style="background:#FFFFFF;"|non-geographic
|}

Map

See also
Postcode Address File
List of postcode areas in the United Kingdom

References

External links
Royal Mail's Postcode Address File
A quick introduction to Royal Mail's Postcode Address File (PAF)

Postcode areas covering the East Midlands
North Northamptonshire
West Northamptonshire District